The Cavendish Invitational is the largest money bridge tournament in the world. In 2012 it moved from Las Vegas to Monaco and from May to October. From 1975 to 2011, first in New York City and later in Las Vegas, it ran from Friday to Sunday on Mother's Day weekend.

History and format

The Cavendish Invitational Pairs and its companion competitions are named for the Cavendish Club of New York City, which was founded in 1925, months before Harold S. Vanderbilt and others created the scoring system that defined "contract bridge". Some if its members were also among the most famous names in bridge, including Vanderbilt, Ely Culbertson, Charles Goren, Oswald Jacoby, Howard Schenken, Sam Stayman, Zia Mahmood, Bobby Levin and Steve Weinstein. It moved a few times from the Mayfair House to the Ambassador Hotel, thence to the Ritz Tower Hotel and the Carlton House.

The Club initiated its invitational pairs tournament on the second weekend in May 1975 and bridge columnist Alan Truscott called it "the prestigious Cavendish Charity Invitation Pairs" when he covered its conclusion in The New York Times a few days later. Through 1991 the Club hosted the Invitational Pairs annually, alongside a companion invitational tournament for individuals from 1978 to 1981 and one for teams beginning 1983. At midnight on Friday, May 31, 1991, the Cavendish Club went out of business because of increasing rent, decreasing membership, and a lease that may have prohibited a move. The tournament continued to be held in New York City until 1997 when World Bridge Productions took over the Invitational Pairs tournament and moved operations to Las Vegas, an action which greatly increased the visibility and purse size for the event.

The WBP added an Open Pairs event to broaden the field for more players. The Invitational Pairs is an auctioned event where the top pairs are acquired by the highest bidder at a black tie cocktail party a day before the event starts. The auction pool for the Pairs event has recently been running around a million dollars and has been as high as 1.5 million. Each pair must purchase a minimum 10% share in itself and may exercise its right to own as much as 40% of itself or more if permitted by the winner of the bid. At the conclusion of the tournament 95% of the auction pool is distributed in a scaled payout to the bid winners. Each pair plays three boards against all the other pairs with a time limit of 25 minutes per round. Up to 45 rounds are played to decide the winner.

Invitational Pairs

The Invitational Pairs or "the Cavendish" is the main event of the annual tournament. Steve Weinstein is the winner seven times, Bobby Levin five, Fred Stewart and Kit Woolsey three times each.

At least three women have finished second, Jacqui Mitchell in 1979 and Judi Radin–Kathie Wei in 1981.

Invitational Individual
In 1978 the Cavendish Club introduced a two-day singles contest which it called the "world individual championship"(1979). Regular partners Harold Lilie and David Berkowitz finished first and second in 1980(1980) and Berkowitz won the fourth and last rendition next year.

Invitational Teams
The John Roberts Teams is named for World Productions co-founder John Roberts. The field of eight (2011) is filled by invitation only but teams may register to be considered.(2011)

World Bridge Productions Open Pairs
First prize in the open pairs includes free entry to the next Invitational Pairs with options regarding the auction. There is an auction for the WBP pairs, minimum bid $1000.(2011)

Notes

References

External links
The Cavendish Invitational subsite at Bridge Winners (2011)

Contract bridge world competitions